The Royal Swedish Academy of Agriculture and Forestry, formerly the Royal Swedish Academy of Agriculture (Kungl. Lantbruksakademien), founded in 1813 at the initiative of Crown Prince Charles, is one of the Royal Academies in Sweden. Initially the academy had a function of being auxiliary to the central administrative authorities. The academy now acts an independent organization, promoting agriculture, forestry and related fields with the support of science and practical experience, in the interest of Swedish society.

See also
Experimentalfältet
:Category:Members of the Royal Swedish Academy of Agriculture and Forestry

External links 
The Royal Swedish Academy of Agriculture and Forestry

1813 establishments in Sweden
Agriculture and Forestry
Agriculture in Sweden
Forestry in Sweden
Science and technology in Sweden